Ligi is a village in Ostróda County, Poland.

Ligi may also refer to:

People
 Alessandro Ligi (born 1989), Italian footballer
 Jürgen Ligi (born 1959), Estonian politician
 Tony Ligi (born 1955), American politician and notable resident of Jefferson Parish, Louisiana
 Ligi Sao (born 1992), New Zealand professional rugby league footballer

Places
 Ligi Ndogo S.C., a Kenyan association football club
 Ligi Ndogo S.C. Academy, the club's youth academy